Robert Kelly is an American stand-up comedian, actor, radio personality, and podcast host.

Kelly frequently performs at the Comedy Cellar. He co-hosts The Bonfire on Sirius XM Satellite Radio, often appeared on The Opie and Anthony Show, and has also appeared on Last Call with Carson Daly, Tough Crowd with Colin Quinn and Premium Blend.

Early life
Kelly was born in Medford, Massachusetts, three miles away from Boston. He was raised in a three-bedroom house with thirteen family members. He is of Irish ancestry, and was raised Catholic. Kelly is a self-confessed addict. He began drinking at age ten before he quit alcohol and drugs at fifteen. He has remained sober since. Kelly was arrested as a teenager, and spent time in a youth detention center.

Career
Kelly discovered stand-up comedy in 1987 while attending the International Conference of Young People in Alcoholics Anonymous, after which he began to listen to comedy albums. He performed his first stand-up routine on stage in 1991 at a school talent competition as part of a sketch comedy troupe, Al and the Monkeys. His plan was to enroll at Bunker Hill Community College in Boston to study fine arts, but gained interest in pursuing comedy and quit shortly before he was to earn an associate degree. After one member of the group quit, they were replaced by Dane Cook. His first solo performance took place at Catch a Rising Star in Cambridge, Massachusetts, which his family attended.

Before taking on stand-up comedy full-time, Kelly worked several jobs including a waiter, delivering flowers, and working with juvenile delinquents. After his comedy troupe split in the early 1990s, Kelly did not perform stand-up for two years. Kelly lived in Los Angeles for a short period of time until he was encouraged to return to the East coast by Patrice O'Neal.

In 1998, Kelly was spotted by an agent through his acting work and went to New York City to further his career. 

In 2004, Kelly made his first of many appearances on the Opie and Anthony radio show. In 2005, Kelly toured with comedians Dane Cook, Gary Gulman, and Jay Davis on the cross-country tour entitled Tourgasm. After tearing (ACL) and straining (MCL) ligaments in his knee, he managed to finish the tour which began airing on HBO as a comedy documentary series in June 2006. Kelly later toured with Cook and Al Del Bene as part of Cook's Global Thermo Comedy Tour: Isolated Incident.

In 2005 and 2006, Kelly accompanied fellow comedian Colin Quinn to Iraq, where they each performed stand-up for American troops stationed in Baghdad.

Kelly was a part of the New Jersey Bamboozle Festival in 2007 as part of the Pass the Mic Comedy Tour on May 6. Kelly also appeared in the 2008 comedy Ghost Town as the ghost of a fat construction worker. That same year, Kelly also had a small voice part in the 2008 video game Grand Theft Auto IV as Luca Silvestri, a member of the Pegorino crime family and associate of Ray Boccino, who accompanied the main character in a mission.

From 2010 to 2015, Kelly starred as Louis CK's brother Robbie during the first, fourth, and fifth seasons of the FX sitcom Louie. Kelly rated his performance on the show as among the best of his acting career.

Kelly started his podcast You Know What Dude! in April 2010 on RiotCast, a podcast network that he co-owns. It is recorded weekly in a studio at the Comedy Cellar. Kelly described the podcast as "a true comic hang". It regularly features Kelly curating a discussion with three to five comedians, with an emphasis on honesty and "ball-busting". His regular guests include Dan Soder, Joe List, and Luis J. Gomez. The show was produced until September 2014 by Kelly Fastuca, and has since been produced by Chris Scopo.

In 2012, a comedy book by Kelly, Burr, and Joe DeRosa entitled Cheat: A Man's Guide to Infidelity was released. The book followed a short film that the three wrote named Cheat.

On August 8, 2014, Kelly released the hour-long special Live at the Village Underground, directed by Bobcat Goldthwait. It premiered on Comedy Central in January 2015.

Kelly co-starred in Sex & Drugs & Rock & Roll for two seasons, beginning in 2015. It was his first acting role as a regular cast member, and received formal drum lessons for the part.

Personal life
Kelly is married to his wife Dawn; they have one son, Max.  In 2015, the family moved from New York City to Westchester, New York.

Filmography

Television

Film

Video games

Discography
 Robert Kelly: Live at the Village Underground (2015)
 For The Love Of Comedy (2013)
 Just the Tip (2008)
 Robert Kelly Live (2003)

References

External links
Robert Kelly

Review of "Just The Tip" CD
Robert Kelly on Talk Radio Meltdown 1-5-12

Living people
American stand-up comedians
American male comedians
American people of Irish descent
American people of Italian descent
Male actors from Boston
Male actors from New York City
People from Medford, Massachusetts
American podcasters
21st-century American male actors
American male film actors
American male television actors
American male video game actors
American male voice actors
Comedians from New York City
21st-century American comedians
Stand Up! Records artists
Year of birth missing (living people)